Peter Bielański (1736 – 29 May 1798) was a Ukrainian Greek Catholic hierarch. He was the Eparchial Bishop of the Ruthenian Catholic Eparchy of Lviv, Halych and Kamianets-Podilskyi from 1798 to 1805.

Life 
Born in Zhovkva, Polish–Lithuanian Commonwealth (present day Lviv Oblast, Ukraine) in a bourgeois family in 1736. He was ordained a priest and become a Canon of the St. George's Cathedral, Lviv until his election as bishop.

He was confirmed by the Holy See as an Eparchial Bishop of the Ruthenian Catholic Eparchy of Lviv, Halych and Kamianets-Podilskyi on 30 October 1779. He was consecrated to the Episcopate on 23 September 1781. The principal consecrator was Metropolitan Yason Smohozhevskyi.

With his assistance, a seminary for the Greek Catholics was opened in Lviv on 30 August 1783.

He died in Lviv on 29 May 1798.

References 

1736 births
1798 deaths
People from Zhovkva
People from Ruthenian Voivodeship
18th-century Eastern Catholic bishops
Bishops of the Uniate Church of the Polish–Lithuanian Commonwealth
People from the Kingdom of Galicia and Lodomeria